Cupriavidus basilensis is a gram-negative soil bacterium of the genus Cupriavidus and the family  Burkholderiaceae. The complete genome sequence of its type strain has been determined and is publicly available at DNA Data Bank of Japan, European Nucleotide Archive and GenBank, under the accession numbers CP062803, CP062804, CP062805, CP062806, CP062807, CP062808, CP062809 and CP062810.

C. basilensis has the ability to ferment 5-hydroxy-2-methylfurfural.

References

External links
Type strain of Cupriavidus basilensis at BacDive -  the Bacterial Diversity Metadatabase

Burkholderiaceae
Bacteria described in 2004